Hide-and-Seek is a 1942 oil on canvas painting in the collection of the Museum of Modern Art (MoMA) in New York City, by Russian painter Pavel Tchelitchew.

The painting measures 6' 6 1/2" x 7' 3/4" (199.3 x 215.3 cm) and was painted between June 1940 and June 1942. It was acquired shortly after its completion by MoMA. Tchelitchew was given a retrospective of his work at MoMA in 1942.

Hide and Seek was completed by Tchelitchew in 1942, but he had been working on variations on its imagery since about 1934.

A phenomenon seen in Hide and Seek is that of the "simultaneous image", in which a degree of ambiguity exists between various components of the composition. This is not unique to Hide and Seek. Related phenomena are seen in the work of other artists, for instance Giuseppe Arcimboldo.

See also
Hidden faces

References

External links
Image of painting at Museum of Modern art, NYC
Talk given by Richard Turnbull of the Museum of Modern Art on two paintings: Pavel Tchelitchew's Hide-and-Seek to Andrew Wyeth's Christina's World. (Scroll down to "MoMA Multimedia".)

Paintings in the collection of the Museum of Modern Art (New York City)
1942 paintings